Álvaro Jurado Espinosa (born 5 September 1981 in Córdoba, Andalusia) is a Spanish retired footballer who played as a defensive midfielder.

External links

1981 births
Living people
Footballers from Córdoba, Spain
Spanish footballers
Association football midfielders
La Liga players
Segunda División players
Segunda División B players
Tercera División players
Sevilla Atlético players
Sevilla FC players
Getafe CF footballers
Lorca Deportiva CF footballers
UD Salamanca players
Cádiz CF players
CD Alcalá players
Ekstraklasa players
I liga players
Piast Gliwice players
Spain youth international footballers
Spanish expatriate footballers
Expatriate footballers in Poland
Spanish expatriate sportspeople in Poland